The following is a timeline of the history of the city of Mantua in the Lombardy region of Italy.

Prior to 17th century

 3rd C. BCE - Romans in power.
 601 CE - Forces of Lombard Agilulf take Mantua.
 804 CE - Roman Catholic Diocese of Mantua established.
 977 - Canossa in power.
 1007 - Boniface III in power.
 1090 - Henry IV, Holy Roman Emperor in power.
 1113 - Forces of Matilda of Tuscany take Mantua.
 1115 - Mantua becomes a "quasi-independent commune."
 1150 -  begins circulating.
 1167 - Mantua joins the Lombard League.}
 1236 - Forces of Frederick II, Holy Roman Emperor attempt to take Mantua.
 1272 - Bonacolsi in power (until 1328).
 1281 - Tower built.
 1328
 Ludovico I Gonzaga in power.
 Ducal Palace, Mantua built.
 1400 - Public clock installed (approximate date).
 1403 - Mantua Cathedral rebuilt.
 1406 - Castle of St. George (Mantua) built.
 1423 - "Latin grammar school" established by Vittorino da Feltre.
 1444 - Ludovico II Gonzaga, Marquis of Mantua in power.
 1460 - Artist Andrea Mantegna moves to Mantua.
 1472
 Printing press in operation.
 Rebuilding of the Basilica of Sant'Andrea begins.
 1480 - Poliziano's  premieres in Mantua.
 1484 - Francesco II Gonzaga, Marquess of Mantua in power.
 1490 - Isabella d'Este becomes wife of Francesco II.
 1530 - Duchy of Mantua established.
 1535 - Palazzo del Te built near Mantua.
 1584 - Jesuit college established.(it)

17th-19th centuries
 1607 - Monteverdi's opera L'Orfeo premieres in Mantua.
 1625 - Jesuit Pacifico Ginnasio Mantovano (university) established.
 1630
 City sacked by Austrian forces during the War of the Mantuan Succession.
 Plague.
 1631 - War of the Mantuan Succession ends; Mantuan Gonzaga-Nevers rulers become "vassals of Vienna" per Treaty of Cherasco.
 1664 - Gazzetta di Mantova newspaper begins publication.
 1686 -  founded.
 1708
 Death of Ferdinando Carlo Gonzaga, Duke of Mantua and Montferrat the last ruler of the Duchy of Mantua.
 Austrians in power.
 1737 - Mantua becomes part of Lombardy.
 1767 - Teatro Bibiena built.
1768 - "Reale Accademia di Scienze e Belle Lettere" (now, Accademia Nazionale Virgiliana di Scienze Lettere ed Arti) founded.
 1779 - "Museum of antiquities" established.
 1780 - Biblioteca Teresiana (library) established.
 1796 - 4 June: Siege of Mantua (1796–97) by French forces begins.
 1797
 2 February: Siege of Mantua ends; French win.
 City becomes seat of the "Mincio department in Napoleon's puppet Cisalpine Republic."
 1799 - Siege of Mantua (1799) by Austrian forces; Austrians win.
 1801 - French in power again per Treaty of Lunéville.
 1809 - Economic unrest.
 1814 - Austrians in power again.
 1822 -  built.
 1853 - Political dissidents executed at nearby Belfiore during the Italian unification movement.
 1866 - Mantua becomes part of the Kingdom of Italy.
 1868 -  (state archives) established.
 1871 - Banca Agricola Mantovana (bank) in business.
 1873 - Mantova railway station opens.
 1884 - Economic unrest; military crackdown.
 1886 -  begins operating.
 1887 -  newspaper begins publication.
 1897 - Population: 29,743.

20th century

 1905 -  demolished.
 1906 - Population: 31,783.
 1908 -  begins operating.
 1911
 Mantova F.C. (football club) formed.
 Population: 32,657.
 1913 - Chamber of Commerce built.
 1930 - Virgil monument erected.
 1934 -  (railway) begins operating.
 1949
  (bus) begins operating.
 Stadio Danilo Martelli (stadium) opens.
 1971 - Population: 65,703.
 1973 - Gianni Usvardi becomes mayor.

21st century

 2005 -  arena opens.
 2006 - Mincio Cycleway constructed between Peschiera del Garda and Mantua.
 2012 - May: Earthquake.
 2013 - Population: 47,223.
 2015 - Mattia Palazzi becomes mayor.

See also
  (Italian version includes timeline)
 List of rulers of Mantua, 984-1708
 , 1184-1400
 List of dukes of Mantua, 1530–1708
 List of mayors of Mantua
 History of Lombardy (it)

Timelines of other cities in the macroregion of Northwest Italy:(it)
 Liguria region: Timeline of Genoa
 Lombardy region: Timeline of Bergamo; Brescia; Cremona; Milan; Pavia
 Piedmont region: Timeline of Novara; Turin

References

This article incorporates information from the Italian Wikipedia.

Bibliography

  (description of Mantua)

in English
 
 
 
 
 
 
 
  + 1870 ed.

in Italian

  1807-1837 (5 volumes)
 
 
 
 
  1958–1963 (3 volumes)
 
  Luigi Cavazzoli. La gente e la guerra. La vita quotidiana del fronte interno: Mantova, 1940-1945 (Milan: Angeli, 1989).
 
 Giada Bologni and Giorgio Casamatti. Bombe su Mantova: La città e la provincia durante i bombardamenti (1943-1945) (Parma: MUP, 2009)

External links

  (city archives)
 
 Items related to Mantua, various dates (via Europeana)
 Items related to Mantua, various dates (via Digital Public Library of America)

Mantua
Mantua
History of Mantua